Jason Rogers Williams (born November 2, 1972) is an American politician and attorney who is the Orleans Parish district attorney; he assumed office in 2021. From 2014 to 2021, Williams served as the Second Division Councilmember-at-large on the New Orleans City Council. He is a member of the Democratic Party, and was elected district attorney on a progressive platform.

Williams was charged with multiple counts of federal tax fraud. In 2022, he was acquitted of all charges.

Early life and education
Williams was born and spent his adolescence in New Orleans. He graduated from Woodward Academy, in College Park, Georgia, and attended Tulane University on a football scholarship, where he was elected class president 4 times. Additionally, he attended Tulane Law School, where he was elected class president 2 times.

Early career 
Shortly after graduating from Tulane Law School, Williams started his own law firm, Jason Rogers Williams & Associates, which he continues to manage. Williams has 3 children. In 2003, he was appointed Pro Tempore at Criminal District Court by the Louisiana Supreme Court.

New Orleans City Council 

Williams is a member of the Democratic Party.

He served as the At-large Division 2 member of the New Orleans City Council from his swearing in on March 15, 2014 until his resignation on January 11, 2021, to assume his position as district attorney. The seat would remain vacant until January 28, 2021, when Donna Glapion was chosen to fill his seat. Williams served as president of the council.

District Attorney of New Orleans 
In 2018, Williams announced he would be a candidate in the 2020 Orleans Parish district attorney election. Williams campaigned on massive reforms to the district attorney's office, which has been plagued with allegations of prosecutorial overreach. 

His campaign was characterized as progressive and part of a movement of progressive reforms in district attorney positions around the United States. His policies are in stark contrast to those of his predecessor, Leon Cannizzaro, who held a more traditional "tough on crime" approach as district attorney. 

Williams would go on to defeat his opponent Keva Landrum on the December 5th election and assumed office January 11, 2021.

Following backlash from a sharp rise in 701 release cases and an increase in related crimes such as car jackings, public calls for Williams resignation have been made. As of February 10, 2022, Williams has not stepped down, but called a press conference to address “701 releases,” an article in State Criminal Court that gives defendants the right to a speedy trial.

Williams criticized Dobbs v. Jackson Women's Health Organization, a ruling by the U.S. Supreme Court to overturn Roe v. Wade. He indicated his office would not prosecute abortion providers, instead, focusing on other crimes.

Tax fraud charges
In June 2020, during his campaign for district attorney, Williams was charged with 11 counts of federal tax fraud. Williams claimed he was innocent. His trial was set by U.S. District Court Judge Martin Feldman for January 2022, but it was delayed due to an appeal made to the United States Court of Appeals for the Fifth Circuit. At trial in July 2022, a jury acquitted Williams of all charges.

Election history

Notes

References

21st-century American politicians
Living people
Louisiana Democrats
New Orleans City Council members
Tulane University alumni
Tulane University Law School alumni
1972 births